Joseph Talbot (born 23 August 1984) is a Welsh singer and songwriter. He has been the vocalist for British rock band Idles since their inception in 2009.

Early life
Talbot was born in Newport on 23 August 1984. He moved to England as a child, where he grew up in Exeter. He met Idles bassist Adam Devonshire at sixth form college in Exeter before the two moved to Bristol, where they studied at the St Matthias Campus of the University of the West of England and decided to start a band. Following university, they went on to start the now-defunct Bat-Cave night at 
their local pub in Bristol.

Music career

Talbot has released four studio albums and many EPs and singles with Idles. His music has been described as punk rock, and post-punk, especially due to its passionate nature and political lyrics, which have criticized right-wing news networks such as Fox News and The Sun, (during the Joy tour, Talbot was known to shout "Don't read The Sun, it'll give you cancer" at shows before the closing song, Rottweiler) and outlined social issues such as depression, white privilege, and toxic masculinity. However, Talbot has rejected all of these genre labels. In 2017, he was quoted saying: "We're not a post-punk band. I guess we have that motorik, engine-like drive in the rhythm section that some post-punk bands have but we have plenty of songs that aren't like that at all." At a 2018 concert in Manchester, he said: "for the last time, we're not a fucking punk band".

Collaborations
Talbot appears on the track Wish on Anna Calvi's fourth full-length album Hunted. In 2020, he collaborated with Jehnny Beth for her debut solo album, To Love Is to Live: he co-wrote and recorded vocals on the track "How Could You".
Talbot also sang guest vocals for fellow Bristolians Turbowolf on the track Capital X from their 2018 album The Free Life. Talbot also appears on the Frank Carter and the Rattlesnakes Single My Town that was released 27 April 2021.

Additionally, he is the subject of the song Blood Brother, by Bristol-based band Heavy Lungs, whose vocalist Danny Nedelko is the namesake and subject of the fourth track on Idles' second record Joy as an Act of Resistance.

Influences
He cites The Strokes, The Streets, Thom Yorke, Battles, The Walkmen, Joy Division, The Horrors, and The Fall as influences.

Personal life
When Talbot was 16, his mother had a stroke and was paralysed; after the death of his step-father, he became his mother's primary caretaker until her death in 2015. She became the primary subject of the Idles album Brutalism.

Talbot and his wife, Beth, have a daughter, Frida. Their first daughter, Agatha, was stillborn in 2017. This became a primary subject of the Idles album Joy as an Act of Resistance.

Talbot is bisexual.

Talbot has stated he is not religious but "I appreciate faith, I’ve got a lot of time for it."

Discography

Studio albums

 Brutalism (2017), Balley
 Joy as an Act of Resistance (2018), Partisan
 Ultra Mono (2020), Partisan
 Crawler (2021)

Live albums
 A Beautiful Thing: Idles Live at le Bataclan (2019), Partisan
Live at Ramsgate Music Hall (2020) - digital download only

Physical singles and EPs
 Welcome (2012), Fear of Fiction
 Meat (2015), Balley
 Meta EP (2015), Balley
 Meat // Anguish EP (2016), Harmacy
 "Well Done" (2017), Balley
 "Divide & Conquer" (2017), Balley
 "Mother" (2017), Balley
 "Danny Nedelko" (2018) – split single with Heavy Lungs
 "Mercedes Marxist" / "I Dream Guillotine" (2019), Partisan
 "Model Village" (feat. Slowthai) (2021), Partisan

Download-only tracks/singles
 "Stendhal Syndrome" (2017), Balley
 "Rachel Khoo" (2017), Balley
 "Colossus" (2018), Partisan
 "Danny Nedelko" (2018), Partisan
 "Samaritans" (2018), Partisan
 "Great" (2018), Partisan
 "Never Fight a Man with a Perm" (2019), Partisan
 "Mr. Motivator" (2020), Partisan
 "Grounds" (2020), Partisan
 "The Beachland Ballroom" (2021), Partisan
 "Car Crash" (2021), Partisan

Compilations
 Meat / Meta (2019), Balley

Guest features
 Wish (from the Anna Calvi album, Hunted)
 My Town (from the Frank Carter & The Rattlesnakes single)
 How Could You (from the Jehnny Beth album, To Love Is to Live)
 Wasted Days (Inbetweens) (from the Larry The Pink Human single)
 Sikh Punk III (from the Primitive Ignorant album, Sikh Punk)
 None of Us Are Getting Out of This Alive (from The Streets mixtape, None of Us Are Getting Out of This Alive) (credited as IDLES)
 Capital X (from the 2018 Turbowolf album The Free Life)
 Come on Down (from the 2022 Metz (band) single Come on Down)

References

Musicians from Bristol
1984 births
Living people
Alumni of the University of the West of England, Bristol
21st-century Welsh male singers
Welsh LGBT singers
Welsh LGBT songwriters
Bisexual singers
Bisexual songwriters
Bisexual men